Eco Defense Group is an American non-profit that sends Special forces operators to develop and train wildlife conservation forces on the African continent.

History
Eco Defense Group operates by invitation only. It is dedicated to leveraging asymmetric advantaged in anti-poaching efforts and supports Rangers on the frontlines through training and equipment. In March 2020, the US Office of Defense Cooperation brought Eco Defense Group to South Africa during the quarantine for a multi-day skills training program with South African National Parks and NCC Environmental Services firefighters.

See also

 Rhinoceros poaching in Southern Africa
 Pangolin trade

References

External links
 Eco Defense Group

Environmental organizations based in Utah
Environmental organizations established in 2017
International environmental organizations
Non-profit organizations based in Utah